Lac Vert or similar terms may refer to various lakes:

France
Lac Vert (Passy), Haute-Savoie
Lac Vert (Lesponne), Hautes-Pyrénées
Lac Vert (Lot), Lot
Lac Vert (Vosges), Haut-Rhin

Elsewhere
Vert Lake (Hébertville), Quebec, Canada 
Lake Vert (Val-d'Illiez), Valais, Switzerland

See also
Green Lake (disambiguation)